The lowland akalat (Sheppardia cyornithopsis) is a species of bird in the family Muscicapidae.
It is found in Cameroon, Central African Republic, Republic of the Congo, Democratic Republic of the Congo, Ivory Coast, Equatorial Guinea, Gabon, Guinea, Liberia, Nigeria, Sierra Leone, Tanzania, and Uganda.
Its natural habitats are subtropical or tropical dry forest and subtropical or tropical moist lowland forest.

References

lowland akalat
Birds of the African tropical rainforest
lowland akalat
Taxonomy articles created by Polbot